Oldham Central tram stop is a tram stop in Oldham town centre on Union Street. It is on the Oldham and Rochdale Line (ORL) The stop takes its name from the closed Oldham Central railway station, which was located south of Oldham Way.

The stop was built as part of Phase 3b of the Manchester Metrolink and opened on 27 January 2014.

Service pattern 

References

External links

Metrolink stop information
Oldham Central area map

Tram stops in the Metropolitan Borough of Oldham
Tram stops on the East Didsbury to Rochdale line
Railway stations in Great Britain opened in 2014
2014 establishments in England